"Mr Cool" was Kevin Ayers' USA promotional single issued to publicize his album, Yes We Have No Mañanas (So Get Your Mañanas Today). It featured a mono mix of the song on one side coupled with a stereo mix on the flip side.

Track listing
"Mr Cool" (Kevin Ayers)
"Mr Cool (Stereo)" (Kevin Ayers)

Personnel
Kevin Ayers – Guitar, Vocals
Billy Livsey – Keyboards
Charlie McCracken – Bass 
Ollie Halsall – Guitar 
Rob Townsend – Drums, percussion 
Roger Saunders – Guitar

1977 singles
Kevin Ayers songs
Songs written by Kevin Ayers
Song recordings produced by Muff Winwood
1976 songs
ABC Records singles